Dane Damron is an American football coach and former player. He is the head football coach at the University of Virginia's College at Wise, a position he had held since the 2016 season.  Damron was the head football coach at Kentucky Christian University from 2007 to 2008, compiling a record of 3–13.

Coaching career
Damron was the head coach at Lake Gibson High School in Lakeland, Florida from 1999 to 2001 finishing with a 22–13 record and leading the program to its first playoff victory in 2000 and first district title in 2001. He left Lake Gibson to take the head coaching job at Boyd County High School in Ashland, Kentucky from 2002 to 2005. The Lions advanced to the second round of the playoffs three straight years, going a combined 24–22 in four seasons at Boyd County.  In 2007, he was chosen to head the new football program at Kentucky Christian Knights located in Grayson, Kentucky. He held that position for the 2007 and 2008 seasons.  His coaching record at Kentucky Christian was 3–13.

Head coaching record

College

References

External links
 Virginia–Wise profile
 Eastern Kentucky profile

Year of birth missing (living people)
Living people
Eastern Kentucky Colonels football coaches
Georgetown Tigers football players
Kentucky Christian Knights football coaches
Virginia–Wise Cavaliers football coaches
High school football coaches in Florida
High school football coaches in Kentucky